António Menezes (born 5 April 1931) is a Portuguese sailor. He competed in the Dragon event at the 1968 Summer Olympics.

References

External links
 

1931 births
Possibly living people
Portuguese male sailors (sport)
Olympic sailors of Portugal
Sailors at the 1968 Summer Olympics – Dragon
Sportspeople from Lisbon